To the Max may refer to:

 To the Max (Con Funk Shun album), 1982
 To the Max (The Mentors album), 1991
 "To the Max" (song), a 2017 song by DJ Khaled

See also
 To the Max!, a 1992 album by Max Roach
 Jade to the Max, a 1992 album by Jade
 "Homer to the Max", a 1999 episode of The Simpsons
 Michael Jordan to the Max, a 2000 IMAX documentary film